The Pinnaroo Cemetery and Crematorium is a cemetery and crematorium located at Graham Road, Bridgeman Downs, Brisbane, Queensland, Australia. It is operated by the City of Brisbane.

History
The cemetery opened in 1962 and the crematorium, chapel and function room opened in 2002.

Burial and cremation options
Unlike many cemeteries in Brisbane, Pinnaroo is still open with new burial sites available. The cemetery offers lawn and lawn beam memorials, but not traditional headstones. Ashes can be placed in niches, or buried or scattered in gardens.

Notable people
Notable people buried at Pinnaroo include:
 Peter Byrne, politician
 William Carter, politician
 Sir Raphael Cilento, Australian medical practitioner and public health administrator
 Lady Phyllis Cilento, Australian medical practitioner and journalist
 Charles English, politician
 Gregg Hansford, Australian touring car and motorcycle racer
 Roy Harvey, Mayor of Brisbane 1982–1985
 Don Lane, politician jailed for corruption
 George Lawson, politician
 Bruce Alexander McDonald, a Major General in the Australian army
 Bill Moore, politician
 Mick Nolan, Australian rules football player, 1975 Premiership-winner with North Melbourne

References

External links
 
 

Cemeteries in Brisbane
1962 establishments in Australia
Cemeteries established in the 1960s